Baverstock is a surname. Notable people with the name include:

Bert Baverstock (1883–1951), English footballer
Donald Baverstock (1924–95), British TV producer and executive
Garry Baverstock (born 1949), Australian architect, property developer, author and scientist 
Gillian Baverstock (1931–2007), English author
Ray Baverstock  (born 1963), English footballer and manager

See also
Baverstock
The Baverstock Academy